Iikka Heino (born 9 January 1995) is a Finnish badminton player. In 2011, he won the gold medal at the European U17 Championships in the mixed doubles event with Mathilda Lindholm. In 2013, he became the runner-up of Estonian International in men's doubles event. In 2014, he won a bronze medal at the European Men's Team Championships in Basel. In 2017, he was a runner-up of the Estonian International tournament in the men's doubles event partnered with Henri Aarnio.

Personal life 
Iikka Heino brother, Eetu Heino, is also a professional badminton players. He started to playing badminton at the age of six in Paraisten, and entered the national team in 2011. To improve his badminton, Iika Heino lives and trains in Holbæk, Denmark.

Achievements

BWF International Challenge/Series (3 runners-up) 
Men's doubles

  BWF International Challenge tournament
  BWF International Series tournament
  BWF Future Series tournament

References

External links 
 

1995 births
Living people
People from Pargas
Finnish male badminton players
Finnish expatriate sportspeople in Denmark
Sportspeople from Southwest Finland
21st-century Finnish people